Yves Prévost (July 11, 1908 – November 27, 1997) was a politician and lawyer in Quebec, Canada.

He was first elected in 1948 for the riding of Montmorency. He served as interim leader of the Union Nationale party and leader of the Opposition in the Legislative Assembly of Quebec from September 1960 to January 1961. He became party leader after UN leader and former Premier Antonio Barrette lost the 1960 election and resigned his seat and the UN leadership a few months later.

In January 1961, he was replaced as interim UN leader and leader of the Opposition by Antonio Talbot, and he did not run in the 1962 election.

Prior to his provincial political career, Prevost served as mayor of the city of Beauport (now part of Quebec City) from 1948 to 1952 and was worked for the Beauport School Board for nearly 20 years at high-class various positions.

In 1956, he was made a Knight Commander of the Order of St. Gregory the Great.

References

1908 births
1997 deaths
Knights Commander of the Order of St Gregory the Great
Lawyers in Quebec
Mayors of places in Quebec
Union Nationale (Quebec) MNAs
Academic staff of Université Laval
Université Laval alumni